is an underground metro station located in Shōwa-ku, Nagoya, Aichi Prefecture, Japan operated by the Nagoya Municipal Subway's Tsurumai Line. The station is an interchange station between the Tsurumai Line and the Sakura-dōri Line and is located 11.9 rail kilometers from the terminus of the Tsurumai Line at Kami-Otai Station and 8.4 rail kilometers from the terminus of the Sakura-dōri Line at Nakamura Kuyakusho Station.

History
Gokiso Station was opened on 18 March 1977. The Sakura-dōri Line began operations to this station from 30 March 1994. Platform screen doors were installed on the Sakura-dōri Line platform from 28 May 2011.

Lines
 
 (Station number: T12)
 (Station number: S10)

Layout
Gokiso Station has two underground opposed side platforms for the Tsrumai Line and one underground island platform for the Sakura-dōri Line.

Platforms

References

External links

 Gokiso Station official web site 

Railway stations in Japan opened in 1977
Railway stations in Aichi Prefecture